Bradley is an unincorporated community located in the town of Cleveland, Marathon County, Wisconsin, United States.

References

Unincorporated communities in Marathon County, Wisconsin
Unincorporated communities in Wisconsin